Hors-la-loi is a Lucky Luke comic by Morris, it was the sixth album in the series and was printed by Dupuis in 1954 and by Cinebook in English in 2014 as Outlaws. The story pits Lucky Luke against a fictionalized version of the Dalton brothers.

Synopsis 
The story begins with a quick presentation of the four Dalton brothers: Bob, Grat, Bill and Emmet Dalton. Their first bank attack in 1889 in El Reno, Oklahoma, marked the start of their criminal careers, followed by a stagecoach attack. The Daltons' growing reputation worries the government, sending Lucky Luke to stop them. This ensures the transport of money of a train. Luke later meets the bandits in a saloon where he gives them a show of force. The Dalton escape under the noses of the villagers. Once released, the Dalton continue their misdeeds and their reputation forces them to remain on their guard. They find Lucky Luke in a saloon and flee. They then try to have cosmetic surgery without success. Believing Lucky Luke removed for good, they decide to attack Coffeyville, on October 5, 1892 at 9 o'clock. There, Lucky Luke finds them and ambushes them in front of the bank, an ambush which will be fatal for them since they will be imprisoned then hanged.

Characters 

 Bob Dalton: The eldest and most intelligent of the four brothers.
 Grat, Bill and Emmet: The other three brothers working as a team with him.

Analysis 
It is the first Lucky Luke story that was based (loosely) on real historical events from the Old West.

Atypically for a Lucky Luke adventure, the villains are killed at the end, as the Dalton brothers meet their fate during the historical 1892 bank robbery at Coffeyville, Kansas. The story departs from historical truth as Bill Dalton is portrayed as taking part in the robbery while he did not operate with his brothers, and Emmett Dalton is shown as dying in the robbery while the historical Emmett Dalton survived the Coffeyville shootout, served 14 years in prison, and died in 1937.

The Dalton characters proved so popular among readers that Morris created a new version of the gang, with their four identical-looking cousins, who went on to become Lucky Luke's main antagonists.

References

External links
Official Website 
Morris publications in Spirou BDoubliées 

Comics by Morris (cartoonist)
Comics based on real people
Comics set in Kansas
Comics set in Oklahoma
Fiction set in 1892
Lucky Luke albums
1954 graphic novels
Works originally published in Spirou (magazine)
Dalton Gang